Haji Salleh Kalbi (born 10 August 1964) was the Member of the Parliament of Malaysia for the Silam constituency in Sabah from 2008 to 2013. He represented the United Malays National Organisation (UMNO) party in the governing Barisan Nasional (BN) coalition.

Salleh was elected to Parliament in the 2008 election, replacing UMNO colleague Samsu Baharun in the seat of Silam. He was dropped as UMNO's candidate for the seat in the 2013 election.

Election results

References 

Living people
1964 births
People from Sabah
Members of the Dewan Rakyat
United Malays National Organisation politicians
Malaysian Muslims